The SM postcode area, also known as the Sutton postcode area, is a group of seven postcode districts in England, within five post towns. These cover part of south-west London, as well as a small part of north Surrey.

The main sorting office is in Sutton, with outgoing mail being sorted at Croydon Mail Centre. The area served includes most of the London Borough of Sutton, while most of SM4 covers the southwestern part of the London Borough of Merton. Most of SM7 and a small part of SM2 cover the northern part of the borough of Reigate and Banstead in Surrey, while SM2 also covers the village of East Ewell in the borough of Epsom and Ewell.



Coverage
The approximate coverage of the postcode districts:

|-
! SM1
| SUTTON
| Sutton, Rosehill, Parts of The Wrythe and Carshalton, Benhilton and Erskine Village, the eastern part of Sutton Common
| Sutton
|-
! SM2
| SUTTON
| Belmont, South Sutton, South Cheam, East Ewell
| Epsom and Ewell, Reigate and Banstead, Sutton
|-
! SM3
| SUTTON
| The western part of Sutton Common, North Cheam, Stonecot Hill
| Epsom and Ewell, Sutton
|-
! SM4
| MORDEN
| Morden, Morden Park, Lower Morden, St. Helier (West), Rosehill
| Merton, Sutton
|-
! SM5
| CARSHALTON
| Carshalton, Carshalton Beeches, Carshalton on the Hill, The Wrythe, Rosehill, St. Helier (South), Little Woodcote
| Sutton
|-
! SM6
| WALLINGTON
| Wallington, Beddington, Hackbridge, Roundshaw
| Sutton
|-
! SM7
| BANSTEAD
| Banstead, Woodmansterne, Nork, Little Woodcote
| Reigate and Banstead, Sutton
|}

Map

See also
Postcode Address File
List of postcode areas in the United Kingdom

References

External links
Royal Mail's Postcode Address File
A quick introduction to Royal Mail's Postcode Address File (PAF)

Postcode areas covering London
Postcode areas covering South East England
Media and communications in the London Borough of Sutton
Media and communications in the London Borough of Merton